Hartmut Losch (11 September 1943 in Angermünde – 26 March 1997 in Neu Fahrland) was a German athlete who competed in the 1964 Summer Olympics, in the 1968 Summer Olympics, and in the 1972 Summer Olympics.

References

1943 births
1997 deaths
East German male discus throwers
German male discus throwers
Olympic athletes of the United Team of Germany
Olympic athletes of East Germany
Athletes (track and field) at the 1964 Summer Olympics
Athletes (track and field) at the 1968 Summer Olympics
Athletes (track and field) at the 1972 Summer Olympics
European Athletics Championships medalists
People from Angermünde
Sportspeople from Brandenburg